Mezilaurus itauba is a species of tree in the family Lauraceae. It is found in Bolivia, Brazil, Ecuador, French Guiana, Peru, and Suriname.

References

Lauraceae
Vulnerable plants
Taxonomy articles created by Polbot
Trees of South America
Taxobox binomials not recognized by IUCN